The 1971 Giro d'Italia was the 55th edition of the Giro, one of cycling's Grand Tours. The  race consisted of 20 stages and an opening prologue, starting in Lecce on 20 May and finishing at the Vigorelli velodrome in Milan on 10 June. There were three time trial stages and a single rest day. Gösta Pettersson of the  team won the overall general classification, becoming the first Swedish rider to win a Grand Tour. Herman Van Springel placed second, 2 min and 32 s in arrears, and Ugo Colombo (Filotex) was third, just three seconds slower than Van Springel.

Teams

Tour de France organizer Félix Lévitan and the Mars-Flandria were in disagreements over the team's participation in the coming Tour de France and there was speculation that the team would instead race the Giro d'Italia. The team chose to wait for Lévitan's decision regarding their entry, which came following the Giro's start, and therefore did not participate in the Giro. Ultimately, Lévitian requested the team to pay extra money, on top of the 25,000 franc entry fee, to participate in the Tour. A total of 10 teams were invited to participate in the 1971 Giro d'Italia.

Each team sent a squad of ten riders, so the Giro began with a peloton of 100 cyclists. The majority of riders were Italian (72), while 28 riders were foreign. Of the non-Italians, Belgians had the most with twelve riders, 10 Spaniards which comprised the whole KAS team, 3 Swedes, 2 Swiss, and one French rider. Only two of the ten teams entering the race were not based in Italy: KAS (Spain) and Magniflex (Belgium). Giorgio Favaro was the last rider to arrive for the race because his Molteni teammate Martin Van Den Bossche was removed shortly before the race's start due to the discovery of an abscess that was operated on in a Vicenza hospital. Out of the riders that started this edition of the Giro d'Italia, a total of 75 riders made it to the finish in Milan.

The teams that took part in the race were:

Pre-race favorites

On 15 January, it was announced that Eddy Merckx the winner of the previous year's race and the 1968 edition would not participate in the race for the first time in four years. Instead, he would focus solely on preparing for the upcoming Tour de France, which he hoped to win for the third consecutive year. An El Mundo Deportivo writer felt Merckx's absence opened the race for other riders to win. Gimondi had finished in the top five of the general classification in each Giro since 1965. Motta entered the Giro after having won the Tour de Romandie. Motta and Gimondi were named favorites. Salvarani announced they would be racing the Tour de France in July; however, Het Vrije Volk writer Peter Ouwerkerk questioned whether the team - which had thirteen riders total - had enough stamina for these large three-week races.

Ouwerkerk felt Salvarani's biggest challenger was to be the Molteni team, even without Merckx, and he specifically felt Herman Van Springel was capable of winning the race. He referenced Gimondi's previous season where he exceeded expectations as a primary reason for his support. Van Den Bossche was also thought to be a challenger for the Salvarani riders before his aforementioned withdrawal before the race. Molteni's riders Marino Basso and Romano Tumellero were thought to give the team enough support in the absence of Merckx. Italo Zilioli, Franco Bitossi, Gösta Pettersson, Patrick Sercu, and Michele Dancelli were other riders that were thought to be contenders for the overall victory.

Route and stages

The race route was unveiled by race director Vincenzo Torriani on 24 February 1971. The start of the race was announced to be in Lecce after the officials of the city paid 20 million lira to the organization to earn the honor. The race contained 20 stages, one of which was a split stage, and one opening prologue. There were ten stages that included categorized climbs that had points to count towards the mountains classification, including the twelfth stage which was a climbing individual time trial to the Serniga di Salò. Six of the stages featured summit finishes. Together, the amount of climbing for the categorized climbs included in the race totaled to be . There were three total time trials, two individual and one team leg. The final stage of the race ended in Milan at the Vigorelli velodrome. The race was televised in an hourly program each day and also covered over the radio.

The race route traveled all the way down to the boot of the Italian countryside. The opening prologue from Lecce to Apulia time trial stage covering , was broken into ten equal  segments, with one rider from each team of ten contesting one part. The team with the lowest total time was declared winner and all of the team's riders go to wear the race leader's maglia rosa the following day. The times did not count towards the general classification for the race. When writing about this stage's format 44 years later, rider Renato Laghi commented "Torriani was forever having strange ideas."

The race entered two countries aside from Italy, Yugoslavia and Austria. This was the first time the Giro entered Austria, as the race traveled through the country to finish on the Großglockner. The race's entry into the Dolomites from June 7 to June 9 was expected to be the highlight. Former Italian cyclist Cino Cinelli stated that he had tried to climb the mountain several times and that the race's cars would have a hard time climbing the mountain.

There was some concern over the quality and condition of the some roads used early in the race, particularly during the second mass-start stage. Five-time champion Alfredo Binda said "Only a climber can win it and it will remain uncertain until Ponte di Legno." El Mundo writer Bosch praised race organizer Torriani for experimenting with new routes and felt that this route was "the best."

Race overview

The race started at 1:45 PM local time in front of the Piazza Sant'Oronzo, it was estimated that 200,000 people watched along the course. The favorites entering the day, Ferretti, finished in fourth, 52 s slower than Salvarani. The group remained together initially before Molteni's Luigi Castelletti attacked off the front of the peloton and gained a few minutes advantage before KAS, G.B.C., and Ferretti riders raised the tempo and caught Castelletti. As rain started to hit the course, Marinus Wagtmans (Molteni) won the second traguardi tricolori sprint of the leg, ahead of Attilio Rota (Dreher). The two then opened up a gap between the peloton reaching 55", but Rota refused to help with the pace and the two were with several kilometers remaining. After the day had under  left there was a crash involving roughly 50 riders. The riders remounted and another attacked ensued by a group of riders; however, it was caught as the peloton geared up for a bunch sprint. The sprint to the line was closely contested by Franco Bitossi (Filotex) and Marino Basso (Molteni) and both celebrated as if to have won the stage, but a photo finish revealed Basso to be the victor and he assumed the lead of the general classification and points classification.

During the seventeenth stage, that finished on the Großglockner, an Alpine pass. Race leader Claudio Michelotto held on to the back of a team car to finish the climb and was given a one-minute penalty. Following the stage, Pettersson took the race lead from Michelotto. Pettersson became the first rider born north of the Rhine to win the Giro d'Italia. In addition, he became the first Swedish rider to win a Grand Tour.

Doping

Doping controls were conducted following each stage finish. If a rider tested positive, the punishment was a ten-minute penalty and their stage results were voided. It was announced on 26 May that Gianni Motta had tested positive for ephedrine. In response to the news, Motta stated that he had used his grandmother's herbs to help with his fatigue. Lucillo Lievore also tested positive.

Classification leadership

Two different jerseys were worn during the 1971 Giro d'Italia. The leader of the general classification – calculated by adding the stage finish times of each rider – wore a pink jersey. This classification is the most important of the race, and its winner is considered as the winner of the Giro.

For the points classification, which awarded a cyclamen jersey to its leader, cyclists were given points for finishing a stage in the top 15. The mountains classification leader. The climbs were ranked in first and second categories, the former awarded 50, 30, and 20 points while the latter awarded 30, 20, and 10 points. In this ranking, points were won by reaching the summit of a climb ahead of other cyclists. In addition there was the Cima Coppi, the Grossglockner, which was the highest mountain crossed in this edition of the race, which gave 200, 100, 80, 70, and 50 points to the first five riders summit the climb. The first rider over the Grossglockner was Pierfranco Vianelli. Although no jersey was awarded, there was also one classification for the teams, in which the stage finish times of the best three cyclists per team were added; the leading team was the one with the lowest total time.

Final standings

General classification

Mountains classification

Points classification

Traguardi tricolori classification

Teams classification

References

Footnotes

Citations

External links
The event at SVT's open archive 

 
G
Giro d'Italia
Giro d'Italia by year
Giro d'Italia
Giro d'Italia
1971 Super Prestige Pernod